Shekleton is a surname. Notable people with the surname include: 

Cameron Shekleton (born 2000), South African cricketer
John Shekleton (1795–1824), Irish doctor and anatomist
Vincent Shekleton (1896–2000), American football player